Christmas Crime Story is a 2017 multi-vignette crime drama directed by Richard Friedman. Written by Sean Chipman and Robert Chipman, the film features an ensemble cast that includes Adrian Paul, Eric Close, Aaron Perilo, Scott Bailey and Neraida Bega in leading roles.

Set during an abnormal heatwave in Los Angeles on Christmas Eve, the film revolves around multiple characters whose lives intersect before, during and after a liquor store robbery.

Plot 
A botched robbery leads down a destructive path for a  detective (Bailey) attempting to reconcile with his estranged mother (Humes), a coming-apart-at-the-seams amateur photographer (Paul), his vindictive and murderous fiancée (Bega), her secret lover (Perilo) and a mall Santa (Close) struggling to remain sober.

Cast 
 Adrian Paul as David Carlisle
 Eric Close as Randall Edwards
 Neraida Bega as Sasha Harrington
 Aaron Perilo as Jason Houston
 Scott Bailey as Chris Dejesus
 Mary-Margaret Humes as Maggie DeJesus
 Tim DeZarn as Barrett Hill
 Alex Fernandez as Detective Ambrozik
 Vince Lozano as Vincent
 Mark Adair-Rios as James Anderson
 Linda Burzynski as Detective Thomas
 Sara Castro as Kasey Edwards
 Anthony Emerson as Matthew Winslow
 Bethany Carol as Lena
 Carlene Moore as News Reporter

Production

Development 
Originally conceived as a short film in 2010, Christmas Crime Story was the brainchild of Sean & Robert Chipman. The script went through development problems as, at two different points, the original script file had become corrupted and the file lost. In 2012, the screenplay was completed and uploaded to an online screenwriting site, SimplyScripts, and was found in May 2016 by director Richard Friedman. With Richard Friedman aboard to direct the film, changes in the script were requested, including: updating the setting from a small Massachusetts town to Los Angeles and updating the conditions from a blizzard to a heat wave. The film is produced by Markus Linecker, Richard Friedman and Vince Lozano.

Filming 
Filming began on December 2, 2016 in Los Angeles, California and concluded on December 14, 2016.

See also
 List of Christmas films

References

External links
 

2017 films
2017 crime drama films
2010s Christmas drama films
American crime drama films
American Christmas drama films
Films set in Los Angeles
Films shot in Los Angeles
2010s English-language films
2010s American films